Twin Rivers Unified School District is a school district in McClellan, California, United States.  The district office is located at 5115 Dudley Boulevard, McClellan, California.

Twin Rivers operates the cleanest school bus fleet in the country, with 25 battery electric buses and ten more on order. It also has 35 buses that run on compressed natural gas and 60 on renewable diesel.

History 
The district was created as a result of the November 2007 approval of Measure B, a proposal to merge the four North Sacramento area school districts: the North Sacramento School District, the Del Paso Heights School District, the Rio Linda Union School District, and the Grant Joint Union High School District. Originally referred to as New North Area Unified School District after Measure B passed, the name Twin Rivers was selected from among 300 submitted by community members during a three-week naming contest.

Administration
Dr. Steve Martinez, Superintendent 
Dr. Lori Grace, Associate Superintendent of School Leadership 
Gina Carreón, Chief Human Resources Officer
Dr. Kristin Coates, Chief Business Officer 
David Lugo, Chief of Police

On December 4, 2007, the trustees selected Frank Porter to serve as Twin Rivers USD Interim Superintendent. Porter, who had been the superintendent of the Rio Linda Union School District was selected for the job over Ramona Bishop, the superintendent of the Del Paso Heights Elementary School District. The new district assumed operational responsibility for the 37,000 students in the four merging districts on July 1, 2008.

Frank Porter has announced his retirement as of June 30, 2012 after four and a half years as the district's superintendent. Rob Ball served about three months as acting superintendent and Joe Williams served 10 months as the interim superintendent. Effective July 1, 2013, Dr. Steven Martinez, previously of Fresno Unified now serves as the district superintendent.

Five of the district's assistant superintendents have become superintendents - Debra LaVoi, Ed.D., became the superintendent at Woodland Joint Unified in July 2009 until her retirement in July 2014, Ramona Bishop, Ed.D.,became the superintendent at Vallejo City Unified in April 2011, Gloria Hernandez-Goff, Ed.D., became the Superintendent of the Ravenswood School District in May 2013, and Rusty Clark became the superintendent of the Pleasant Ridge School District near Grass Valley in June 2013. June 2020 Andy Weather Director of Special Projects be came Superintendent of the Grass Valley School District. Dr. Shelly Holt, secondary curriculum director for the district when it first started is now in the Fontana Unified School District in Southern California.

Areas Served
A portion of the City of Sacramento is served by Twin Rivers Schools. North Sacramento and Del Paso Heights are served by Grant Union High School and Trustees Rebecca Sandoval, Linda Fowler and Christine Jefferson. Norte Del Rio High School also served this area until its closure in the 1980s.

Three of Sacramento's westside suburbs are served by Twin Rivers Schools:
Foothill Farms - this area is served by Foothill High School and Trustee Michael Baker and Michelle Rivas
North Highlands - this area is served by Highlands High School and Trustee Michelle Rivas and Christine Jefferson 
Rio Linda - this area is served by Rio Linda High School and Trustee Bob Bastian

Board of Trustees 
The trustees are:
 Michelle Rivas, President of the Board
 Michael Baker, Vice President of the Board       
 Christine Jefferson, Clerk of the Board
 Stacey Bastian 
 Rebecca Sandoval
 Basim Elkarra, 
 Linda Fowler

Notable alumni
There have been several students and staff members of the schools that are within the Twin Rivers USD.

Darren Oliver - Rio Linda High - Pitcher Anaheim Angels MLB
 Virginia Avila - Grant Union High School Teacher - California Teacher of the Year 2003    
 Sean Chambers - Highlands High School Class of 1983,  - Alaska Aces (PBA) star player   
 Grantland Johnson - Grant Union High School graduate - Former California Secretary of Health and Human Services
 Scott Galbraith - Highlands High School, Class of 1985 - former professional American football tight end in the NFL for nine seasons - played in Super Bowl XXVIII with the champion Dallas Cowboys (final score Dallas 30, Buffalo 13) 
 Dr. William H. Lee - Grant Union High School graduate - Owner/Publisher of The Sacramento Observer   
 Rob Vernatchi - Twin Rivers Adult School (formerly Grant Adult Education) NCOA Referee Graduate - NFL Official (Field Judge)   
 George Wright - Grant Union High School Graduate - Organist
 Rob Kerth - former Sacramento City councilmember and mayoral candidate
 Lloyd Connelly - Sacramento County Judge, former Assemblymember and Sacramento City Councilmember
 Allen Warren-  Former Sacramento City Councilmember

Susan Peters, Sacramento County Board of Supervisors 

Alumni who came back to serve on the Board of Trustees
 Alecia Chasten 2008-2012 (Highlands)
 Michelle Rivas 2008–2012, 2014–Present (Foothill)
 Bob Bastian 2008–2022 (Grant)
 Rebecca Sandoval 2012–Present (Norte Del Rio)
 Michael Baker 2012–Present (Foothill)
 Christine Jefferson 2020-Present (Grant)
 Stacey Bastian 2022-Present (Rio Linda)

References

http://sacramento.cbslocal.com/2013/11/07/twin-rivers-trustee-taking-leave-while-facing-accusations-of-illegal-loans-falsifying-paternity-test/
http://sacramento.cbslocal.com/2012/06/28/grand-jury-report-blasts-twin-rivers-unified-school-district-administrators/
http://sacramento.cbslocal.com/2012/06/04/twin-rivers-looking-to-advertise-at-school-sites/
http://sacramento.cbslocal.com/2013/11/12/twin-rivers-unified-school-cafeteria-was-shut-down-after-failed-health-inspection/

External links
 

School districts in Sacramento County, California
School districts established in 2007
2007 establishments in California